Terri Tatchell (born January 1, 1978) is a Canadian screenwriter, best known for co-writing the screenplay of District 9 and was nominated for Best Adapted Screenplay at the 82nd Academy Awards.

Career
Tatchell graduated in 2001 from the Vancouver Film School's Writing for Film and Television program. She began her screenwriting career in 2006 with the IDEALOGUE short action film Adicolor Yellow under the direction of her husband Neill Blomkamp. In 2008, Tatchell wrote, with Blomkamp, the screenplay of the science-fiction film District 9, which was released in 2009. Her work on District 9 has since garnered a number of awards nominations, including an Academy Award nomination for Best Adapted Screenplay and the Saturn Awards. She won the 2009 Bradbury Award from the Science Fiction and Fantasy Writers of America for her work on the screenplay.

In November 2019, Tatchell put out the first picture book in the Endangered and Misunderstood series Aye-Aye Gets Lucky, illustrated by Ivan Sulima. Each book in the series features a lesser-known endangered animal and all proceeds go directly to charities helping with the conservation of the featured animal.

Filmography
 Adicolor Yellow (2006)
 District 9 (2009)
 Chappie (2015)
Zygote (2017)

References

External links 
 
 Endangered and Misunderstood

1978 births
Living people
21st-century Canadian women writers
Nebula Award winners
Canadian women screenwriters
Writers from Vancouver
21st-century Canadian screenwriters